The Horrifying Truth is the debut studio album by New Zealand rock band I Am Giant, released on 1 August 2011. It debuted at No. 2 and has been certified Gold in New Zealand. The album became the highest selling NZ rock album of 2011.

With the increasing interest in the band in Asia and Europe, the album was also released in Asia on 23 March 2012, and in the UK on 8 October 2012.

Production
The Horrifying Truth was recorded from January to April 2011 with acclaimed Australian alternative rock producer/engineer Forrester Savell. The album was recorded in Sony Studios in Sydney and Forrester's studio at Sing Sing Studios in Melbourne. I Am Giant bassist Paul Matthews and drummer Shelton Woolright became the album's co-producers.

Promotion
Three singles have been released from the album. "And We'll Defy" was released on 10 June 2011, with the accompanying music video released onto YouTube on 15 July 2011. Music video for "Let It Go" was released onto YouTube on 2 December 2011, and for "Purple Heart" – on 27 April 2012.

Track listing

Personnel

I Am Giant
 Ed Martin – vocals
 Shelton Woolright – drums, co-producer
 Paul Matthews – bass guitar, co-producer
 Aja Timu – guitar

Additional personnel
 Forrester Savell – producer

Charts and certifications

Chart positions

Certifications

References 

2011 debut albums
I Am Giant albums